Ghaus Abad or Ghousabad (earlier Mahatam) is a town and union council of Dera Ghazi Khan District in the Punjab province of Pakistan Ghousabad was earlier known as Mahatam after partition of india a large hindu population of village migrated from here to delhi and faridabad in india.

References

Populated places in Dera Ghazi Khan District
Union councils of Dera Ghazi Khan District
Cities and towns in Punjab, Pakistan